Jasper Cornelius Pattenden (born 15 April 2002) is an English professional footballer who plays for  Wycombe Wanderers as a midfielder.

Career
Pattenden began his career with Brighton & Hove Albion as a youth player, before moving to Worthing in 2018, where he made his debut in the FA Trophy against Burgess Hill Town. 

Pattenden joined Wycombe Wanderers in July 2022. He made his professional debut on 9 August 2022, playing the whole of Wycombe's 2-1 win at Northampton Town in the EFL Cup first round. He made his league debut on 16 August in a 3–1 defeat to Exeter City. On 15 November 2022, Pattenden joined National League club Dorking Wanderers on loan until 3 January 2023.

Career statistics

References

External links

2002 births
Living people
English footballers
Association football midfielders
Brighton & Hove Albion F.C. players
Worthing F.C. players
Wycombe Wanderers F.C. players
Dorking Wanderers F.C. players
Isthmian League players
English Football League players